Pine County is a county in the U.S. state of Minnesota. As of the 2020 census, the population was 28,876. Its county seat is Pine City. The county was formed in 1856 and organized in 1872.

Part of the Mille Lacs Indian Reservation is in Pine County.

History
Pine County was organized on March 1, 1856, with territory partitioned from Chisago and Ramsey counties. The original county seat was Chengwatana. It was named for its abundant pine tree growth.

In 1857, Buchanan County in full and southern parts of Aitkin and Carlton Counties were formed from the original Pine County, with Kanabec County organized a year later. In 1861, Buchanan County was dissolved and folded into Pine County. Pine County was reorganized in 1872, with Pine City named as the county seat for the remaining smaller area.

Popular culture
Pine County has been featured in a series of mysteries by Dean Hovey.

Geography
Pine County lies on the east side of Minnesota. Its southeast border abuts Wisconsin (across the St. Croix River). The St. Croix flows southerly along its border. The Kettle River flows southeastward through central Pine County, discharging into the St. Croix on the county's east border, and the Snake River flows eastward through the lower part of the county toward its discharge point into the St. Croix. The county terrain consists of low rolling hills, carved with drainages, partly wooded and otherwise devoted to agriculture. The terrain slopes to the south and east, with its highest point near its northeast corner, at 1,319' (402m) ASL.

Major highways

  Interstate 35
  Minnesota State Highway 18
  Minnesota State Highway 23
  Minnesota State Highway 48
  Minnesota State Highway 70
  Minnesota State Highway 107
  Minnesota State Highway 123
 List of county roads

Adjacent counties

 Carlton County - north
 Douglas County, Wisconsin - northeast
 Burnett County, Wisconsin - east
 Chisago County - south
 Isanti County - southwest
 Kanabec County - west
 Aitkin County - northwest

Protected areas

 Banning State Park
 Chengwatana State Forest
 DAR Memorial State Forest
 General C. C. Andrews State Forest
 Kettle River Scientific and Natural Area
 Nemadji State Forest (part)
 Pine County State Game Refuge
 Saint Croix National Scenic Riverway (part)
 St. Croix State Park
 Wild River State Park (part)

Demographics

2020 census

Note: the US Census treats Hispanic/Latino as an ethnic category. This table excludes Latinos from the racial categories and assigns them to a separate category. Hispanics/Latinos can be of any race.

2000 census
As of the 2000 census, there were 26,530 people, 9,939 households, and 6,917 families in the county. The population density was 18.8/sqmi (7.26/km2). There were 15,353 housing units at an average density of 10.9/sqmi (4.20/km2). The racial makeup of the county was 91.9% White, 2.0% Black or African American, 3.1% Native American, 0.30% Asian, 0.03% Pacific Islander, 0.4% from other races, and 1.9% from two or more races.  2.4% of the population were Hispanic or Latino of any race. 32.3% were of German, 11.6% Swedish, 11.1% Norwegian and 5.5% American ancestry.

There were 17,276 households, out of which 31.20% had children under the age of 18 living with them, 56.50% were married couples living together, 8.70% had a female householder with no husband present, and 30.40% were non-families. 25.10% of all households were made up of individuals, and 10.90% had someone living alone who was 65 years of age or older. The average household size was 2.53 and the average family size was 3.02.

The county population contained 25.50% under the age of 18, 7.70% from 18 to 24, 27.90% from 25 to 44, 23.90% from 45 to 64, and 15.00% who were 65 years of age or older. The median age was 38 years. For every 100 females there were 108.80 males. For every 100 females age 18 and over, there were 108.30 males.

The median income for a household in the county was $37,379, and the median income for a family was $44,058. Males had a median income of $31,600 versus $22,675 for females. The per capita income for the county was $17,445.  About 7.80% of families and 11.30% of the population were below the poverty line, including 14.60% of those under age 18 and 10.00% of those age 65 or over.

Communities

Cities

 Askov (originally Partridge)
 Brook Park
 Bruno
 Denham
 Finlayson
 Henriette (originally Cornell)
 Hinckley (originally Central Station)
 Kerrick
 Pine City (county seat)
 Rock Creek
 Rutledge
 Sandstone 
 Sturgeon Lake
 Willow River

Unincorporated communities

 Beroun
 Cloverdale
 Cloverton
 Duquette
 Duxbury
 Ellson
 Friesland
 Greeley
 Groningen
 Kingsdale
 Lake Lena 
 Markville 
 Mission Creek
 Nickerson
 Pokegama 
 West Rock

Ghost towns

 Belden
 Banning
 Big Spring
 Blomskog
 Chengwatana 
 Cornell
 Clint
 Danewood
 Eaglehead
 Harlis
 Midway
 Milburn
 Mission Creek
 Outflow 
 Tozer Camp 
 Turpville
 Tuxedo
 Villstad
 Wareham

Townships

 Arlone Township
 Arna Township
 Barry Township
 Birch Creek Township
 Bremen Township
 Brook Park Township
 Bruno Township
 Chengwatana Township
 Clover Township
 Crosby Township
 Danforth Township
 Dell Grove Township
 Finlayson Township
 Fleming Township
 Hinckley Township
 Kerrick Township
 Kettle River Township
 Mission Creek Township
 Munch Township
 New Dosey Township
 Nickerson Township
 Norman Township
 Ogema Township
 Park Township
 Partridge Township
 Pine City Township
 Pine Lake Township
 Pokegama Township
 Royalton Township
 Sandstone Township
 Sturgeon Lake Township
 Wilma Township
 Windemere Township

Politics
Pine County was once a Democratic stronghold. Since 1932, in only five national elections has the county selected the Republican presidential nominee, with three of those the most recent presidential elections (thru 2020).

See also
 National Register of Historic Places listings in Pine County, Minnesota

References

External links
 Pine County Government's Website
 Mn/DOT Official Map of Southern Pine County
 Mn/DOT Official Map of Northern Pine County

 
Minnesota counties
1872 establishments in Minnesota
Populated places established in 1872